"Welcome Rain" is a song recorded by Japanese-American singer-songwriter Ai from her twelfth studio album, Dream. Written and produced by Nao'ymt, the song has been used in web commercials for Asahi Breweries. Lyrically, the song is about communication through a difficult situation. Critics have compared the song to "Aldebaran".

Background 
"Welcome Rain" was included on Ai's twelfth studio album Dream as its fourth track. Although not released as a single, Ai teamed up with Asahi Breweries to promote the song. In March 2022, The First Take revealed they would be releasing a live recording of Ai performing the song on their official YouTube channel. The performance would serve as her second appearance on the channel, her first previous appearance was a week prior performing "Aldebaran". The performance premiered on March 2. On March 6, EMI Records announced Ai's First Take version of "Welcome Rain" would impact digital stores on March 25. In promotion of the live performance, Asahi Breweries released a limited version of their beer with the design of The First Take logo on the can, along with a QR code to watch the performance on YouTube.

Music and lyrics 
Barks has described "Welcome Rain" as a song with a "delicate" melody with a "deep message", comparing it to Ai's 2021 single, "Aldebaran". Natalie Music has described the lyrics having the theme of spring.

Live performances 
Ai performed "Welcome Rain" live for The First Take. Ai additionally performed the song at her Dream Tour.

Personnel 
Credits adapted from Dream liner notes and Tidal.

Original version 

 Ai Uemura – lead vocals
 Naoaki Yamata – production, songwriting
 D.O.I – mixing
 Randy Merrill – mastering

The First Take version 

 Ai Uemura – lead vocals
 Naoaki Yamata – production, songwriting
 Taji Okuda – vocal engineering, mastering

Release history

References 

2022 songs
Ai (singer) songs